All Saints' Church, Ryde is a parish church in the Church of England located in Ryde, Isle of Wight. The building is a landmark of the island, the spire being visible from many places around the Isle of Wight and from the mainland, projecting beyond the skyline. All Saints'  is sometimes referred to as the "Cathedral of the Island" It is a Grade II* ecclesiastical listed building.

Architecture

The church was built between 1868 and 1872 by the architect George Gilbert Scott. The spire was an addition of 1881/82. A previous tradition saw the spire climbed early on the Feast of the Ascension to sing an Ascension hymn.

All Saints' is listed as a 'large' church in ornate Second Pointed style, constructed of stone-rubble with ashlar dressings. There are six bay-pointed arcades with naturalistic capitals. The chancel walls were painted by Clayton and Bell. The vestry - now the choir song school - was added by C Pemberton-Leach in 1891.

There are two side chapels: The Warrior Chapel in the north aisle - which is a memorial chapel - and The Chapel of The Good Shepherd in the south aisle, which was the original sacristy. The pulpit, reredos and font are all typical Scott features, The pulpit is made of Derbyshire alabaster on polished marble columns, and appeared in The Great Exhibition of 1851, winning 1st prize in its class.

The tower contains a ring of eight bells cast by Messrs Taylor and Co of Loughborough in 1866.

There are some fine examples of stained glass windows but these are mostly confined to the north aisle and sanctuary areas, the other windows having been destroyed by enemy action during the Second World War. The window in the Chapel of the Good Shepherd is dedicated to the memory of Samuel Poole (d 1872).

On the north east corner of the church boundary is a Calvary cross war memorial.

Services and worship
Usual Sunday services:
9am BCP Holy Communion Service.
First Sunday of the Month 10:30am ¡Saints Alive! informal all age service.
Celtic style services and Taize coming soon
All Saints' was, until 2020, the only church on the Isle of Wight to offer a fully sung evensong every Sunday.
Other services (subject to change):
 Ash Wednesday: Sung Eucharist with formal imposition of ashes
 Maundy Thursday: Sung Eucharist with washing of feet and Stripping of Altar
 Good Friday: The All Saints' Rite at the midpoint of a three-hour meditation
 Remembrance Sunday: civic service with presentation of standards and act of remembrance

Choir
Until recently, an established choir existed at All Saints' which has been tradition since its consecration. The choir used to sing at all main services as well as the additional services listed above and at weddings and funerals.  A new choir is currently in formation and will be singing again at services soon.

For many years, the choir has been affiliated to the Royal School of Church Music (RSCM) and the younger choristers were once trained using the RSCM 'Voice for Life' programme and also occasionally trained with other professionals.

In previous services, music sung ranged from Tallis and Byrd to more modern composers - communion settings by Kenneth Leighton and Grayston Ives and anthems by Malcolm Archer, Colin Mawby, Alan Ridout and Paul Edwards.

Prior to 2016, the choir sung evensong at the cathedrals of Portsmouth, Salisbury, Winchester and Chichester.

Organ

The organ is by Henry Willis dating from 1874. 
A specification of the organ can be found on the National Pipe Organ Register.

Organists and Directors of Music

Sidney M. Lake 1864–1872
W.B. Souter 1872–1874
Frank H. Simms 1874–1889 (afterwards organist of St. Paul's Church, New Orleans, United States of America)
W. Warden Harvey (FRCO) 1889–1894
Rev. J. Godfrey Luard M.A. 1894–1896 said to have been organist at St Andrews, president of the Jeu de Paume de Parc Beaumont in Pau, France (1910–1919)
Edmund Goldsmith 1896–1898
Richard Yates Mander Mus. Doc. FRCO 1898–1913 (previously organist of St. Philip's Cathedral, Birmingham)
Ernest G. Welsh (ARCO) 1913–1929 (previously organist at All Saints' Church Hessle)
D J Bevan (ARCO) 1929–1932
Osborne Edward Weare (FRCO) 1932–1934
Earnest G. Welsh (ARCO) 1934–1946
Wilfrid L. Reed 1946–1970
John Lea BA Mus (Hons) LTCL 1970–1976
John Flower 1976 (ARCO) subsequently Assistant from 1977 to 1995
Derek Beck LRAM 1977–1984
W W L Baker (FRCO - chair) LRAM 1984–1988
R Weir BA LTCL 1988–1991
John Lea (Director of Music) 1992–1996
Andrew Cooper (Organist) 1995 onward
Robert Weir (Director of Music) 1996–1998
John Lea (Director of Music) 1998–2003
Godfrey Davis MA ARCO (Director of Music) 2003–2010
John Lea (Director of Music) 2010–2011
Graeme Martin (Director of Music) 2011–2012
John Lea (Director of Music) 2012 and, subsequently, esteemed Director of Music Emeritus
Simon Jarvis BSc (hons), PGCE (Director of Music) 2013-2017
Andrew Cooper Organist and Director of Music 2017–2020'Alan Finch (Director of Music) 2020-

Performances
The church's acoustic makes it a popular venue for various visiting performers and it hosts the choral section of The Isle of Wight Music, Dance and Drama Festival.

Vicars of Ryde
 [William] Harding Girdlestone DD 1867–1868
 Alexander Poole MA 1868–1891
 John Shearme MA 1891–1905 [Hon. Canon of Winchester Cathedral] Albert Gossage Robinson MA 1905–1908  [Hon. Canon of Winchester Cathedral] Hugh Le Fleming MA 1908–1927
 George Alexander Johnstone MA 1927–1932  [Hon. Canon of Portsmouth Cathedral] William Neville Martin MA 1932–1936
 Reginald Stuart Moxon DD 1937–1946
 Alexander Cory MA 1946–1952 [Hon. Canon of Portsmouth Cathedral] Ralph Harry Bassett MA 1953–1962
 Ronald Harry Granger 1963–1970 [Hon. Canon of Portsmouth Cathedral]''
 Patrick Connor Magee 1970–1972
 Douglas John Turner 1972–1981
 Ernest James Green 1982–1991
 David William Dale 1992–1998
 David Blair Foss 1999–2001
 Jonathan Francis Redvers Harris 2003–2011
 Graham Edwin Morris 2012–2018
 Interregnum 2019
 Samantha Martell 2020-2021

References

Church of England church buildings on the Isle of Wight
Grade II* listed churches on the Isle of Wight
Ryde